Highback chub (Hybopsis hypsinotus) is a species of freshwater fish in the carp family (Cyprinidae).

Geographic distribution
This species can be found in the foothills of the Blue Ridge Mountains above the Fall Line, as well as in portions of the Peedee and Santee river drainages in the Piedmont region.

Ecology
The highback chub is a freshwater fish of the United States. It can be found in clear to turbid water in creeks and small to medium rivers with sandy or rocky bottoms. It appears to spawn on the nests of the bluehead chub (Nocomis leptocephalus).

References

Hybopsis
Fish described in 1870
Fish of the United States